Chachakumani (Quechua chachakuma a medical plant, -ni an Aymara suffix to indicate ownership, "the one with the chachakuma plant, Hispanicized spellings Chachacomani, Chachacumani)  may refer to:

 Chachakumani, a mountain in the La Paz Department, Bolivia
 Chachakumani (Canchis), a mountain in the Canchis Province, Cusco Region, Peru
 Chachakumani (Cochabamba), a mountain in the Cochabamba Department, Bolivia
 Chachakumani (Oruro), a mountain in the Oruro Department, Bolivia
 Chachakumani (Quispicanchi), a mountain in the Quispicanchi Province, Cusco Region, Peru

See also 
 Chachakumayuq